Victory is a volcano on New Guinea island, Papua New Guinea. It is situated on Cape Nelson, 30 km from Tufi in an area with no Wadati-Benioff zone. It is one of four large stratovolcanos in Northern New Guinea island, the others being Hydrographers Range, Trafalgar and Lamington.

Morphology

Victory is dominantly Andesitic in origin, but also has traces of Basalt and Dacite, the lavas erupted have an unusually high level of Chromium and Nickel. The volcano is densely forested in all but the summit crater. On the sides of the volcano (near the summit) are four lava domes, two on the SW flank and two on the NE flank. The summit crater is breached to the SE and was probably created by a landslide. The summit now contains a small crater lake where weak thermal activity continues.

Eruptions

A small eruption may have occurred in 1810 (give or take 10 years), but this event is uncertain. The only known eruption from Victory was a long-term eruption that lasted from the late 19th century to the mid 20th century.

1890-1935 ± 5 years Eruption
An eruption from Victory began in around 1890. The eruption extruded a Lava Dome. The eruption produced deadly Pyroclastic flows that probably resulted in the deaths reported by local residents in the 1890s. The constant glow from Victory's long-term eruption (which could have ended as late as 1940) provided a beacon for passing ships. The stop date for the eruption is unknown but it ended between 1930-1940.

See also
 Mount Victory (Papua New Guinea)

References
 
 Volcano Live
 Volcanoes of The World, 3rd ed. 2011, Siebert, Simkin, Kimberly

External links
 Photo of Victory Volcano on Panoramio.com

Stratovolcanoes of Papua New Guinea
Active volcanoes